Lynda Margaret Clark, Baroness Clark of Calton , known as Lady Clark of Calton, (born 26 February 1949) is a Scottish judge. She was formerly the Labour Member of Parliament for Edinburgh Pentlands. She was Advocate General for Scotland from the creation of that position in 1999 until 2006, whereupon she became a Judge of the Court of Session in Scotland.

Career
Clark read Law at Queens College, St Andrews during its transition to independence as the University of Dundee School of Law, graduating in 1970 with an LL.B. (Hons) from St Andrews, and subsequently gained a PhD in Criminology and Penology from the University of Edinburgh in 1975 presenting the thesis "Bail decision-making : law and practice in Scotland" . She was a lecturer in Jurisprudence from 1973 at the University of Dundee until she was called to the Scottish Bar in 1977. She took silk in 1989, and was subsequently called to the English Bar in 1990 as a member of the Inner Temple.

Politics 
Clark first stood for election to Parliament at the 1992 general election, where she unsuccessfully contested the North East Fife seat held by Menzies Campbell of the Liberal Democrats. At the 1997 general election, she was elected to the House of Commons for the Edinburgh Pentlands constituency, unseating the Conservative Secretary of State for Foreign and Commonwealth Affairs, Malcolm Rifkind. Rifkind was one of the high-profile losses on election night for the Conservative Party, who experienced their worst defeat since the 1906 general election and lost all their seats in both Scotland and Wales.

In May 1999, Clark was appointed as the first-ever Advocate General for Scotland, a new post created by the Scotland Act 1998 to advise the Crown and Government of the United Kingdom on Scots law.

She stood down at the 2005 general election, allowing Secretary of State for Transport Alistair Darling to contest the new Edinburgh South West constituency.

On 13 May 2005, it was announced that Clark would be created a life peer, and on 21 June 2005 the title was gazetted as Baroness Clark of Calton, of Calton in the City of Edinburgh.

On 18 January 2006, Lady Clark of Calton resigned as Advocate General, pending an expected judicial appointment. She was replaced as Advocate General by Neil Davidson, QC (now Lord Davidson of Glen Clova).

Judge 
On 19 January, Clark was appointed as a Senator of the College of Justice, a judge of the Supreme Courts of Scotland.  She was installed in office in February 2006.

On 21 June 2012, Lady Clark succeeded Lord Drummond Young as Chairman of the Scottish Law Commission. Lady Clark demitted office on 31 December 2013 in order to sit in the Inner House of the Court of Session, and was succeeded as Chairman by Lord Pentland.

As of 2016, Lady Clark of Calton is the most recent Senator of the College of Justice to have served in the House of Commons.

She retired from the bench in 2019.

Publications
The Role of the Advocate General for Scotland

References

External links
TheyWorkForYou.com – Baroness Clark of Calton
The Public Whip – Voting Record – Lynda Clark MP/Baroness Clark of Calton
BBC News – Lynda Clark profile – October 2002
Guardian – Ask Aristotle – Dr Lynda Clark

|-

1949 births
Living people
Advocates General for Scotland
Alumni of the University of Dundee
Alumni of the University of St Andrews
Alumni of the University of Edinburgh
Life peeresses created by Elizabeth II
Female members of the Parliament of the United Kingdom for Scottish constituencies
Clark of Calton
Scottish Labour MPs
Members of the Faculty of Advocates
Members of the Inner Temple
Members of the Privy Council of the United Kingdom
Members of the Parliament of the United Kingdom for Edinburgh constituencies
UK MPs 1997–2001
UK MPs 2001–2005
Clark
Scottish women judges
Scottish King's Counsel
20th-century Scottish women politicians
20th-century Scottish politicians
21st-century Scottish women politicians
21st-century Scottish politicians
Women Law Officers of the Crown in the United Kingdom